Stefan Netzle (born 31 December 1957) is a Swiss rower. He won the gold medal in the coxless four at the 1982 World Rowing Championships.
Netzle is a lawyer and has been a judge at the Court of Arbitration for Sport from 1991 to 2010.

References

External links
 
 

1957 births
Living people
Swiss male rowers
Olympic rowers of Switzerland
Rowers at the 1980 Summer Olympics
Rowers at the 1984 Summer Olympics
World Rowing Championships medalists for Switzerland